Metcalf is a village in Young America Township, Edgar County, Illinois, United States. The population was 139 at the 2010 census.

Geography

Demographics
As of the 2020 census there were 139 people, 113 households, and 92 families residing in the village. The racial makeup of the village was 93.53% White, 0.72% African American, 0.72% Native American, 0.72% from other races, and 4.32% from two or more races. Hispanic or Latino of any race were 1.44% of the population.

There were 113 households, out of which 45.13% had children under the age of 18 living with them, 74.34% were married couples living together, 3.54% had a female householder with no husband present, and 18.58% were non-families. 18.58% of all households were made up of individuals, and 7.08% had someone living alone who was 65 years of age or older. The average household size was 2.34 and the average family size was 2.12.

The village's age distribution consisted of 21.3% under the age of 18, 2.5% from 18 to 24, 30.5% from 25 to 44, 23.4% from 45 to 64, and 22.2% who were 65 years of age or older. The median age was 44.4 years. For every 100 females, there were 132.0 males. For every 100 females age 18 and over, there were 123.8 males.

The median income for a household in the village was $45,919, and the median income for a family was $46,691. Males had a median income of $31,250 versus $25,347 for females. The per capita income for the village was $21,763. About 2.2% of families and 6.3% of the population were below the poverty line, including 5.9% of those under age 18 and none of those age 65 or over.

References

Villages in Edgar County, Illinois
Villages in Illinois